Abdul Joshi (born 3 December 1983) is a Pakistani mountaineer who became the first climber in the world to summit the main  Passu Cones peak in Pakistan's Gilgit-Baltistan on 14 August 2021. Abdul is known as the "Path Finder" amongst the local mountaineering fraternity for his talent of finding new, unclimbed routes. He is also the first person in the world to cross F.N./Joshi Pass and Verjerav Pass. On 16 May 2022, he became the eight Pakistani to summit Mount Everest.

Abdul started his mountaineering career as a helper and high-altitude porter on  mountain expeditions in Pakistan. He climbed his first peak, Manglik Sar, at the age of 18.

Abdul has also been involved in multiple high-altitude rescue operations. In June 2019, Abdul, who was at Camp 3 of Passu Cones, only  from the summit, received news of an avalanche that had hit an Italian-Pakistani expedition on Melvin Jones Peak. Abdul abandoned his expedition and joined a four-member team to rescue the stranded climbers. On 12 September 2021, Abdul led a successful rescue operation on Rakaposhi to retrieve three stranded climbers, two of which were Czech citizens climbing without permits.

Mountaineering expeditions 

Passu Cones 14 August 2021
Annapurna 16 April 2021
Mount Everest 16 May 2022

References 

Living people
Pakistani mountain climbers
Pakistani summiters of Mount Everest
People from Hunza-Nagar District
1983 births